Yiğitler is a village in the Karlıova District, Bingöl Province, Turkey. The village is populated by Kurds of the Maksudan tribe and had a population of 1,310 in 2021.

The hamlets of Çatal, Gülabi and Mezracık is attached to the village.

References 

Villages in Karlıova District
Kurdish settlements in Bingöl Province